Peter Small (20 January 1925 – 21 April 2003) was a New Zealand cricketer. He played in thirteen first-class matches for Canterbury from 1946 to 1959.

See also
 List of Canterbury representative cricketers

References

External links
 

1925 births
2003 deaths
New Zealand cricketers
Canterbury cricketers
Cricketers from Christchurch
South Island cricketers